The Passfield White Paper, issued October 20, 1930, by colonial secretary Lord Passfield (Sidney Webb), was a formal statement of British policy in Palestine, which previously had been set by the Churchill White Paper of 1922. The new statement resulted from the Hope-Simpson Commission's investigation into the deeper causes of the 1929 Palestine riots, that initially started over access to the Western Wall. The white paper limited official Jewish immigration to a much greater degree.

The paper's tone was decidedly anti-Zionist since several of its institutions were severely criticized, including the Histadrut (General Federation of Labor) and the Jewish Agency, which both promoted Jewish employment of only Jewish labor, thereby supporting the ejection of Palestinians from purchased land, most who previously worked under a tenant farming system. Like the Hope-Simpson Report, the Passfield White Paper found this Zionist policy damaging to the economic development of the Arab population. It concluded that Jewish immigration to Palestine was taking land from the Arab fellahs; sales of land to Jewish settlers should in future be restricted, and Arab unemployment levels should be a factor in considering permitted levels of Jewish immigration to Palestine. Furthermore, a legislative council should be formed which would represent the (Arab) majority of its population. In support of the supposed shortage of land in Palestine, Passfield's wife Beatrice Webb claimed that there was "no room to swing a cat" there.

Zionists claimed it backtracked from what they felt were commitments in the Balfour Declaration and, if implemented, would limit Jewish immigration to Palestine. Contrary to these claims, the White Paper states that the development of a Jewish National Home in Palestine is a consideration, which would enjoy continued support, but it was not central to mandate governance. The paper states that the British intend to fulfill their mandate obligations to both Palestinians and Jews, and they would resolve any conflicts that might surface as a result of their respective needs.

Zionist organizations worldwide mounted a vigorous campaign against the document.  In Britain it led to British prime minister Ramsay MacDonald's clarification of the white paper in front of the British House of Commons and in a letter to Chaim Weizmann in 1931 (see below) known as the MacDonald Letter.

The MacDonald Letter aimed to placate the Zionists while disturbing the Palestinians as little as possible. When many Zionists took the letter as a withdrawal of the white paper, it became labelled the 'black letter' by Palestinians . This was despite the fact that Prime Minister said in parliament on 11 February 1931 that he was "very unwilling to give the letter the same status as the dominating document" i.e. the Passfield White Paper.  The letter itself also stated that it aimed to provide justice to "non-Jewish sections of the community". By confirming that the policy of the Palestine Mandate was to continue to support Jewish immigration, the Letter in effect negated some of the implications of the White Paper and facilitated increasing immigration during the growth of anti-semitism in Europe in the 1930s.

See also

Peel Commission, 1937

References

Bibliography
 Hyamson, Albert Montefiore,  Palestine: A Policy. Methuen, 1942
 Shapira, Anita (2014). Ben-Gurion - Father of Modern Israel. Nerw Haven and London: Yale University Press. .
Jewish Virtual Library: Passfield White Paper

1930 in Mandatory Palestine
1929 Palestine riots
Documents of Mandatory Palestine
White papers
1930 documents
Documents of the United Kingdom